A list of films produced in Hong Kong in 2004:.

2004

External links
 IMDB list of Hong Kong films
 Hong Kong films of 2004 at HKcinemamagic.com

2004
Films
Lists of 2004 films by country or language